Alaungdaw Kathapa National Park is a national park in Myanmar covering . It was established in 1989 and is listed as one of the ASEAN Heritage Parks.

History 
In 1893, this mountainous area between the Chindwin and Myittha Rivers was declared a reserved forest and selectively logged for teak. It was little disturbed when surveyors of the Food and Agriculture Organization and the United Nations Development Programme visited it in the early 1980s,  who were invited by the Government of Myanmar to assist in identifying suitable areas for national parks and nature reserves. Its name honours a legendary monk who lived there in historical times.

Biodiversity 
Alaungdaw Kathapa National Park harbours foremost mixed deciduous forest, evergreen forest and pine forest with 165 tree species and 39 species of medicinal plants.

Asian elephant (Elephas maximus), gaur (Bos gaurus), Himalayan black bear (Ursus thibetanus), sun bear (Helarctos malayanus), dhole (Cuon alpinus), sambar deer (Cervus unicolor), Indian muntjac (Muntiacus muntjak), wild boar (Sus scrofa), Indian crested porcupine (Hystrix indica) and black giant squirrel (Ratufa bicolor) were sighted during a transect survey in January 1999. The elephant population was estimated at between two and 41 individuals in 2003, based on dung surveys conducted over three years.
Wildlife recorded during a camera trap survey in 1999 comprised yellow-throated marten (Martes flavigula), Asian palm civet (Paradoxurus hermaphroditus), large Indian civet (Viverra zibetha), small Indian civet (Viverricula indica), hog badger (Arctonyx collaris), crab-eating mongoose (Herpestes urva), leopard (Panthera pardus), Asiatic golden cat (Catopuma temminckii) and leopard cat (Prionailurus bengalensis).

In 2000, the bent-toed gecko Cyrtodactylus annandalei was discovered in the national park and described as a new species in 2003. It is sympatric with Cyrtodactylus slowinskii.
Oriental leaf-toed gecko (Hemidactylus bowringii), Brooke's house gecko (H. brookii), common house gecko (H. frenatus), Indo-Pacific gecko (H. garnotii) and flat-tailed house gecko (H. platyurus) also live in the national park.

References

External links

National parks of Myanmar
Protected areas established in 1989
Important Bird Areas of Myanmar
Sagaing Region
ASEAN heritage parks